The 1983–84 season was Atlético Madrid's 43rd season since foundation in 1903 and the club's 38th season in La Liga, the top league of Spanish football. Atlético competed in La Liga, and the Copa del Rey.

Squad

Transfers

In

Out

Results

La Liga

Position by round

League table

Matches

Copa del Rey

Second round

Third round

Eightfinals

UEFA Cup

Round of 32

Copa de la Liga

First round

Eightfinals

Quarterfinals

Semifinals

Final

Statistics

References

External links
 Official website

Atlético Madrid seasons
Atlético Madrid